Clarence Samuel Clay Jr. (1923–2011) was a geophysicist specialized in oceanography. He was known for his contributions in acoustics. Although he signed most of his papers, "C.S. Clay", he was called simply, "Clay" by his friends, students, and colleagues. He was also known as "Clay Clay".

Biography
Clay grew up living in Emporia, Kansas and he was known as C. S.  During grade school C.S was a flying model airplane designer,  builder, and competitor. To become successful he taught himself the necessary mathematics he needed.  In high school he was a particularly good student in chemistry and music. He graduated from Emporia High School in June 1941.

That fall he became a freshman at Kansas State College (now Kansas State University), but left to serve in the Army during World War II. After basic training, he was placed in specialized programs at the University of Cincinnati and Ohio State University. He was then assigned to the Army Signal Corps to maintain and operate electronic equipment. While in Ohio, he met Jane Edwards and, after completion of Clay's training, they were married in 1945. Clay's group was chosen to maintain electronic equipment during the planned invasion of Japan.

After separation from the Army, Clay completed both the Bachelor's (1947) and Masters (1948) degrees in Physics at Kansas State University. At the University of Wisconsin-Madison, his doctoral dissertation under Professor Gibson Winas was entitled, “Field Strengths and Spectra of High Frequency Gas Discharges.” After completing the PhD in 1951, Clay taught for one year at the University of Wyoming, but then joined the Carter Oil Company Research Laboratory in Tulsa, Oklahoma, as a Research Physicist to develop new methods for geophysical exploration . In 1955 Clay moved to the Hudson Laboratories of Columbia University where he was a Senior Research Associate for marine geophysical research. Here Clay worked in group specializing in marine acoustics that group located several important U.S. and Russian sunken ships. At Hudson Labs, he presumably had access to one of the early IBM 650 computers. With his colleague I. Tolstoy, he coauthored a monograph on ocean acoustics published in 1966.

Clay worked on problems in signal processing that led to five patents between 1959 and 1967. His 1959 patent for a “multiple transducer array … of particular utility in the area of seismic prospecting” US Patent 2,906,363 has been referenced as recently as 2000 by several petroleum companies. His 1964 patent for “Signal Correlation Method and Means” US Patent 3,158,830 for "oceanic depth measurement" refers “not only to measurements of the depth of the water, but also to the depth measurements of the earth layers below”. It led, years later, to a Navy sonar project for mapping the underside of the ice pack floating in the Arctic Ocean to determine if submarines could safely navigate beneath it. Similarly, the 1967 patent for “Directional Filtering of Summed Arrays” for “maximization of signal output by means of a matched-filter technique” US Patent 3,307,190 with Robert A. Frosch explicitly recognizes the mathematical similarity between sound waves in water and electromagnetic waves in air. Indeed, the patent refers to the sonar and radar "arts", respectively, anticipating — before digital computers — many techniques, such as “time reversal”, that continue to see widespread application and extensive research today.	

Clay joined the geophysics faculty at the University of Wisconsin-Madison in 1968. As faculty members in the graduate program in Oceanography and Limnology, Clay and Professor John Magnuson developed methods for tracking aquatic organisms. They conducted cruises off Cape Hatteras using acoustical techniques to study the distribution of organisms along the northern edge of the Gulf Stream front. They then extended their research over deeper water beyond the Continental Shelf. Clay also conducted a geophysical survey of the Extremely Low Frequency antenna array in northern Wisconsin that was used for communication with ships anywhere on Earth.  
	
While at University of Wisconsin-Madison, Clay published a second edition of the Tolstoy and Clay monograph  and two editions (1977 and 1998) of another monograph on acoustical oceanography with former Hudson colleague, H. Medwin. These two books have appeared in Russian translations and are the international standard references for marine acoustics. Clay also published a textbook for exploration seismology (1990). In 1993, the Acoustical Society of America recognized Clay's preeminence by awarding him its silver medal, “for contributions to understanding acoustic propagation in layered waveguides, scattering from the ocean's boundaries and marine life, and ocean parameters and processes”.

Students

Prof. Clarence S. Clay advised 17 graduate students, including 12 Ph.D. theses and 10 Masters' theses, at the University of Wisconsin-Madison:

Berkson, Jonathan Milton, "A gravity survey in the vicinity of Michipicoten island,
Lake Superior 
",  1969   
Degree: Master's 
Advisor:  Clay

Berkson, Jonathan Milton, "Microrelief of western Lake Superior
",  1972   
Degree: Doctoral 
Advisor:  Clay

Catchings, Rufus, "Crustal structure from seismic refraction in the Medicine Lake area of the Cascade Range and Modoc Plateau, Northern California 
",  1983   
Degree: Master's
Advisor:  Clay

Cheng, Amy I Mei, "Satellite magnetic survey in southern high latitudes 
",  1988   
Degree: Doctoral
Advisor:  Clay

Chu, Dezang, "Impulse response of a density contrast wedge using normal coordinates
",  1989
Degree: Doctoral 
Advisor:  Clay

Daneshvar, Mohammad Reza, "Easterly extension of the Flambeau resistivity anomaly in northern Wisconsin 
",  1977   
Degree: Master's
Advisor:  Clay

Daneshvar, Mohammad Reza, "Imaging of rough surfaces and planar boundaries using passive seismic signals 
",  1987   
Degree: Doctoral 
Advisor:  Clay

Doll, William Eugene, "Computer controlled laboratory studies in transient electromagnetic scale modeling 
",  1980   
Degree: Master's 
Advisor:  Clay

Doll, William Eugene, "Seismic diffraction processing applied to data from Ashland County, Wisconsin
",  1983   
Degree: Doctoral 
Advisor:  Clay and Hesbiboz

Eckstein, Barbara Ann, "Gravity data analysis of western Vilas County, northern Wisconsin 
",  1986   
Degree: Doctoral
Advisor:  Clay

Huang, Kung, "PDF of backscattered sound from live fish 
",  1977   
Degree: Master's 
Advisor:  Clay

Johnston, Steven Craig, "Frequency domain analysis of AC dipole-dipole electromagnetic soundings 
",  1975   
Degree: Master's 
Advisor:  Clay

Kan, Tze Kong, "Sonar mapping of underside of pack ice 
",  1973   
Degree: Master's 
Advisor:  Clay

Kan, Tze Kong, "Ray theory approximation in geoelectromagnetic probing 
",  1975   
Degree: Doctoral
Advisor:  Clay

Leong, Wing Kwong, "Sea floor topography and microtopography southwest of the Iberian Peninsula 
",  1973   
Degree: Doctoral 
Advisor:  Clay

Okwueze, Emeka Emmanuel, "Geophysical investigations of the bedrock and the groundwater lake flow system in the Trout Lake region of Vilas County, northern Wisconsin 
",  1983   
Degree: Doctoral 
Advisor:  Clay

Peterson, Miles Lander, "Hydroacoustic fish stock assessment 
",  1975   
Degree: Master's
Advisor:  Clay 
 
Sandness, Gerald Allyn, "A numerical evaluation of the Helmholtz integral in acoustic scattering 
",  1973   
Degree: Doctoral 
Advisor:  Clay 
 
Skibicky, Taras V., "Use of matched filters to form an additive array in electromagnetic sounding 
",  1982   
Degree: Master's
Advisor:  Clay

Sternberg, Ben K., "Controlled source electromagnetic soundings of the crust in northern Wisconsin
",  1974
Degree: Master's
Advisor:  Clay and Bentley

Sternberg, Ben K., "Electrical resistivity structure of the crust in the southern extension of the Canadian Shield 
",  1977   
Degree: Doctoral
Advisor:  Clay

Young, Charles Thomas, "Magnetotelluric measurements of conductivity anomalies in northern Wisconsin 
",  1977   
Degree: Doctoral 
Advisor:  Clay

References

External links
U.S. Patent 3,158,830
U.S. Patent 3,307,190
U.S. Patent 2,906,363
Memorial Resolution at University of Wisconsin-Madison

1923 births
2011 deaths
Emporia High School alumni
People from Emporia, Kansas
American geophysicists
United States Army personnel of World War II